The Academy is a historic home located at Heathsville, Northumberland County, Virginia.  It was built about 1800, and is a 1½-story, brick house in the Tidewater Federal style.  It is topped by a gabled standing seam metal roof.  The interior preserves a large quantity of original woodwork including the original stair.  Also on the property are the contributing early-19th century brick smokehouse and a barn (1929).  The house was restored between 1994 and 1997.  It is located in the Heathsville Historic District.

It was listed on the National Register of Historic Places in 1997.

References

Houses on the National Register of Historic Places in Virginia
Federal architecture in Virginia
Houses completed in 1800
Houses in Northumberland County, Virginia
National Register of Historic Places in Northumberland County, Virginia
Individually listed contributing properties to historic districts on the National Register in Virginia